Patrick Joseph Murray (July 18, 1897 – November 5, 1983) was a Major League Baseball pitcher for the 1919 Philadelphia Phillies.

Murray made his major league debut at age 21. His final appearance came less than two months later. Overall, he made two starts and ended up with an 0–2 record with one complete game. He went hitless in 12 at-bats. He attended the University of Notre Dame.

External links
Baseball Reference

1897 births
1983 deaths
Major League Baseball infielders
Notre Dame Fighting Irish baseball players
Philadelphia Phillies players
Baseball players from New York (state)